Dendryphantes hastatus is a jumping spider species in the genus Dendryphantes that lives in the Palearctic.

References

Spiders described in 1757
Spiders of Russia
Invertebrates of Central Asia
Spiders of Europe
Spiders of China
Salticidae
Spiders of Africa
Taxa named by Carl Alexander Clerck